William Lloyd Roots (10 September 1911 – 14 August 1971) was a British Conservative politician.  He was elected as Member of Parliament (MP) for Kensington South at the 1959 general election, and served until his resignation in 1968.

References

External links 
 

1911 births
1971 deaths
Conservative Party (UK) MPs for English constituencies
UK MPs 1959–1964
UK MPs 1964–1966
UK MPs 1966–1970